Ann Mah (May 5, 1951) was a Democratic member of the Kansas House of Representatives, representing the 53rd district. She served between 2005 and 2013. She was elected to the Kansas State Board of Education in November, 2016, representing District 4.

Mah also worked as a trainer and speaker, and is the owner of Discover Strategies. Previously she worked as an Area Manager for SBC and a teacher in Emporia and Chase County Public Schools.

She is a member of the Capitol Area Federated Women's Democratic Club, Shawnee County Democrats, and the American Business Women's Association. She is president of the Lutheran Fine Arts Council of Topeka. Mah formerly served on the State Committee of the North Central Association, on the board of directors of the United Way of Greater Topeka, and on the Shawnee Heights Public Schools Foundation Board of Directors.

Mah received her Bachelor of Science and Master of Science in Education from Emporia State University.

Issue positions
Mah had planned bills for a number of her legislative priorities, including Unilateral annexation, KPERS retiree income limits, Immigration reform, and Tax credit for college tuition.

Committee membership
 Education
 Higher Education (Ranking Member)
 Local Government

Major donors
The top five donors to Mah's 2008 campaign:
 Kansas Contractors Association: $1,000 	
 AT&T: $1,000
 Kansans for Lifesaving Cures: $1,000 	
 Pioneer Communications: $1,000 	
 Kansas Assoc of Realtors: $900

See also 

 2020 Kansas elections

References

External links
 
 Project Vote Smart profile
 Kansas Votes profile
 State Surge - Legislative and voting track record
 Follow the Money campaign contributions:
 2006, 2008

Schoolteachers from Kansas
American women educators
Emporia State University alumni
Living people
Democratic Party members of the Kansas House of Representatives
Women state legislators in Kansas
1951 births
21st-century American women politicians
21st-century American politicians